The Summers memo was a 1991 memo on trade liberalization that was written by Lant Pritchett and signed by Lawrence Summers who was then Chief Economist of the World Bank. It included a section that both Summers and Pritchett say was sarcastic that suggested dumping toxic waste in third-world countries for perceived economic benefits.

After the material was leaked by Roberto Smeraldi of Friends of the Earth to Jornal do Brasil on February 2, 1992. Pritchett (who worked under Summers) stated that he had written the memo and Summers had only signed it, and that it was intended to be "sarcastic". According to Pritchett, the memo as leaked was doctored to remove context and intended irony, and was "a deliberate fraud and forgery to discredit Larry and the World Bank".

Daniel Hausman and Michael McPherson have argued that the satirical section might seem to be based in economics as a science, but in fact contains strong moral premises which cannot be removed and still leave the argument intact. Brazilian Secretary of the Environment Jose Lutzenberger argued that it demonstrated "the arrogant ignorance of many conventional 'economists' concerning the nature of the world we live in".

Text of the excerpt

Coverage
Extensive news articles and discussion regarding this memo were included in the US Senate hearing records for Summers' nomination to Secretary of the Treasury in 1993. In this hearing, Summers stated:

References

External links
 The Logic of a Free Market Economist, a critique of some of the economic logic in the memo.

Environmental policy
Memoranda
Economic globalization
Classified documents
1991 documents
History of globalization